Christian Kwabena Andrews who is popularly called Osofo Kyiri Abosom is a Ghanaian priest and politician.

Politics
Andrews launched the Ghana Union Movement (GUM) in March 2019. During the event, he described himself as the new Kwame Nkrumah and declared that the "spirit of Nkrumah is back". He hoped to be able to break the duopoly between the National Democratic Congress and the New Patriotic Party which have dominated Ghana during the Fourth Republic.

2020 Pandemic
Andrews was keen to have as limited a lockdown period as possible during the COVID-19 pandemic. He gave the Akufo-Addo government a week to relax the social distancing rules or face the wrath of God.

2020 election
He is the GUM candidate for President of Ghana in the 2020 Ghanaian general election. He is key to continue with ideas of Kwame Nkrumah, first President of Ghana. He was also keen to have an all inclusive government with a Muslim as his running mate. Abu Grant Lukeman was thus chosen to be his running mate. Andrews is also well known for being the Founder and General Overseer of Life Assembly Worship Centre.

References

See also
Ghana Union Movement

Year of birth missing (living people)
Living people
Candidates for President of Ghana
Ghana Union Movement politicians